Meriwether County is a county located in the west central portion of the U.S. state of Georgia. As of the 2020 census, the population was 20,613. The county seat is Greenville, home of the Meriwether County Courthouse. The county was formed on December 14, 1827, as the 73rd county in Georgia. It was named for David Meriwether, a general in the American Revolutionary War and member of Congress from Georgia.

Meriwether County is part of the Atlanta-Sandy Springs-Roswell, GA Metropolitan Statistical Area.

Geography

The county is located in the Piedmont region of the state. Portions of the Pine Mountain Range are found in the southern parts of the county near the cities of Warm Springs and Manchester.

The eastern two-thirds of Meriwether County, going east from just west of U.S. Route 27 Alternate, is located in the Upper Flint River sub-basin of the ACF River Basin (Apalachicola-Chattahoochee-Flint River Basin).  The western third of the county is located in the Middle Chattahoochee River-Lake Harding sub-basin of the same ACF River Basin.

Major highways

  Interstate 85
  U.S. Route 27 Alternate
  State Route 18
  State Route 41
  State Route 54
  State Route 54 Spur
  State Route 74
  State Route 85
  State Route 85 Alternate
  State Route 85 Spur
  State Route 100
  State Route 109
  State Route 109 Spur
  State Route 173
  State Route 190
  State Route 194
  State Route 362
  State Route 403 (unsigned designation for I-85)

Adjacent counties
 Coweta County (north)
 Spalding County (northeast)
 Pike County (east)
 Upson County (southeast)
 Talbot County (south)
 Harris County (southwest)
 Troup County (west)

Demographics

2000 census
As of the census of 2000, there were 22,534 people, 8,248 households, and 6,012 families living in the county. There were 9,211 housing units at an average density of 18 per square mile (7/km2). The racial makeup of the county was 58.9% White, 40.4% Black or African American, 0.6% Native American, 0.1% Asian, 0.07% Pacific Islander, 0.34% from other races, and 0.71% from two or more races. Of the population 0.85% were Hispanic or Latino of any race.

There were 8,248 households, out of which 31.50% had children under the age of 18 living with them, 49.00% were married couples living together, 18.40% had a female householder with no husband present, and 27.10% were non-families. 23.80% of all households were made up of individuals, and 10.60% had someone living alone who was 65 years of age or older.  The average household size was 2.68 and the average family size was 3.18.

In the county, the population was spread out, with 26.60% under the age of 18, 9.00% from 18 to 24, 27.20% from 25 to 44, 23.60% from 45 to 64, and 13.60% who were 65 years of age or older.  The median age was 36 years. For every 100 females, there were 91.40 males.  For every 100 females age 18 and over, there were 86.50 males.

The median income for a household in the county was $31,870, and the median income for a family was $37,931. Males had a median income of $29,766 versus $21,444 for females. The per capita income for the county was $15,708.  About 13.60% of families and 17.80% of the population were below the poverty line, including 25.90% of those under age 18 and 16.30% of those age 65 or over.

2010 census
As of the 2010 United States Census, there were 21,992 people, 8,522 households, and 5,906 families living in the county. The racial makeup of the county was 57.9% white, 39.1% African American, 0.6% Asian, 0.4% American Indian, 0.7% from other races, and 1.2% from two or more races. Those of Hispanic or Latino origin made up 1.6% of the population. In terms of ancestry, 14.3% were American, 12.7% were English, and 9.8% were Irish.

Of the 8,522 households, 32.1% had children under the age of 18 living with them, 45.1% were married couples living together, 18.7% had a female householder with no husband present, 30.7% were non-families, and 26.8% of all households were made up of individuals. The average household size was 2.55 and the average family size was 3.09. The median age was 41.0 years.

The median income for a household in the county was $37,845 and the median income for a family was $47,126. Males had a median income of $36,164 versus $28,873 for females. The per capita income for the county was $18,295. About 12.8% of families and 16.8% of the population were below the poverty line, including 24.5% of those under age 18 and 11.9% of those age 65 or over.

2020 census

As of the 2020 United States census, there were 20,613 people, 8,051 households, and 5,504 families residing in the county.

Politics
Meriwether County is a moderately Republican county. The last Democrat to win the county was Al Gore in 2000.

Media
The county is served by the Meriwether Vindicator newspaper.

Communities
 Alvaton
 Gay
 Greenville (county seat)
 Lone Oak
 Luthersville
 Manchester
 Warm Springs
 Woodbury

See also
 National Register of Historic Places listings in Meriwether County, Georgia
List of counties in Georgia

References

External links
 Official page

 
1827 establishments in Georgia (U.S. state)
Meriwether
Georgia (U.S. state) counties
Populated places established in 1827